Javad Foroughi (born 11 September 1979) is an Iranian sport shooter, born in Dehloran. He represented Iran at the 2020 Summer Olympics in Tokyo, competing in Men's 10 metre air pistol and in Mixed 10 metre air pistol team.

Foroughi competed in the men's 10 metre air pistol competition in the 2020 Olympics on 24 July. He qualified to the final, finishing 5th with a score of 580. In the final he started out in the lead in the 1st competition stage, scoring 101.0, a slight distance to 2nd place Pang Wei with 99.7. In the 2nd competition stage, Foroughi remained in the lead throughout the entire competition, finishing 1st and winning gold ahead of silver medalist Serbian Damir Mikec. Foroughi scored 244.8 and set a new Olympic record.

His medal was Iran’s first medal in Shooting in the history of Olympics. At the age of 41, Foroughi became the oldest medalist in Iranian Olympic history. Mahmoud Namjoo had won a bronze medal at the age of 38 in 1956 Melbourne.

Foroughi is a nurse in the Islamic Revolutionary Guard Corps (IRGC) and served in Syria in 2012-13 as part of the Corps' medical deployment. Iranian human rights activists decried Foroughi's Olympic medal. For example, United for Navid, a campaign set up by Iranian-American women's rights activist Masih Alinejad of the VOA Persian Service after the execution of Navid Afkari, said that due to Foroughi's membership in IRGC, he "is a current and longtime member of a terrorist organization".

References

External links 
 

1979 births
Living people
People from Ilam Province
Iranian male sport shooters
Shooters at the 2020 Summer Olympics
Olympic shooters of Iran
Olympic gold medalists for Iran
Medalists at the 2020 Summer Olympics
Olympic medalists in shooting
Islamic Revolutionary Guard Corps personnel of the Syrian civil war
Shooters at the 2018 Asian Games
20th-century Iranian people
21st-century Iranian people